A lobster clasp, also known as a lobster hook, lobster claw, trigger clasp, or bocklebee clasp, is a fastener that is held closed by a spring. The lobster clasp is opened or closed by holding a small lever, usually with a fingernail, long enough to apply, then it is attached (or removed from) a short link-chain or a ring-like structure. Lobster clasps are often used for necklaces, bracelets, and keychains.

Lobster clasps are named as such because of their "pinching" mechanism, and they are often shaped like a lobster's claw.

See also

 Bolt snap
 Carabiner

Jewellery components
Fasteners

References